Real Madrid Club de Fútbol is a Spanish professional association football club based in Madrid. The club was formed in 1902 as Madrid Football Club, and played its first competitive match on 13 May 1902, when it entered the semi-final of the Campeonato de Copa de S.M. Alfonso XIII. Real Madrid currently plays in the Spanish top-tier La Liga, having become one of the founding members of that league in 1929, and is one of three clubs, the others being Barcelona and Athletic Bilbao, to have never been relegated from the league. They have also been involved in European football ever since they became the first Spanish club to enter the European Cup in 1955, except for the 1977–78 and 1996–97 seasons.

This list encompasses the major honours won by Real Madrid and records set by the club, their managers and their players. The player records section includes details of the club's leading goalscorers and those who have made most appearances in first team competitions. It also records notable achievements by Real Madrid players on the international stage, and the highest transfer fees paid and received by the club.

The club currently holds the record for the most European Cup / UEFA Champions League triumphs, with 14, and the most La Liga titles, with 35. Additionally, Real has won the Copa del Rey 19 times, the Supercopa de España 12 times, the Copa de la Liga once, the Copa Eva Duarte once, the UEFA Cup twice, the European/UEFA Super Cup five times, the Intercontinental Cup three times and the FIFA Club World Cup five times. Powered by its fourteen European Cups, Real Madrid have a distinction of being the most successful club in terms of international titles, having amassed 29 pieces of silverware, more than any other team in the world. On the domestic front, its 68 titles rank second to Barcelona. The club's record appearance maker is Raúl, who made 741 appearances from 1994 to 2010; the club's record goalscorer is Portuguese forward Cristiano Ronaldo, who scored 450 goals in all competitions from 2009 to 2018.

Players

Appearances
Competitive, professional matches only. Bold indicates player is still active at club level.
As of 19 March 2023.

Others
 Player with most major trophies at Real Madrid: 25 –  Marcelo
 Youngest first-team player:  –  Martin Ødegaard v Getafe, 2014–15 La Liga, 23 May 2015
 Oldest post-Second World War player:  –  Ferenc Puskás v Real Betis, 1965–66 Copa del Generalísimo, 8 May 1966
 Most appearances in La Liga: 550 –  Raúl
 Most appearances in Copa del Rey: 84 –  Santillana
 Most appearances in Copa de la Liga: 13 –  Isidoro San José
 Most appearances in Supercopa de España: 15  –  Sergio Ramos
 Most appearances in International competitions: 1621 –  Iker Casillas
 Most appearances in UEFA club competitions: 1572 –  Iker Casillas
 Most appearances in European competitions: 1553 –  Iker Casillas
 Most appearances in UEFA Champions League: 152 –  Iker Casillas
 Most appearances in European Cup Winners' Cup: 16 –  Gregorio Benito
 Most appearances in UEFA Cup: 44 –   Míchel
 Most appearances in UEFA Super Cup: 5
 Dani Carvajal
 Karim Benzema
 Luka Modrić
 Most appearances in Intercontinental Cup: 3
 Pachín
 Fernando Hierro
 Raúl
 Roberto Carlos
 Most appearances in FIFA Club World Cup: 9 
 Toni Kroos
 Karim Benzema
 Most appearances as a foreign player in all competitions: 634 –  Karim Benzema
 Most appearances as a foreign player in La Liga: 431 –  Karim Benzema
 Most appearances as a substitute in all competitions: 207 –  Guti
 Most appearances as a substitute in La Liga: 159 –  Guti
 Most consecutive league appearances: 171 –  Alfredo Di Stéfano – from 27 September 1953 at 22 February 1959 is 

1Includes all European club tournaments, Intercontinental Cup and FIFA Club World Cup.
2Includes all European club tournaments and Intercontinental Cup.
3Includes European Cup / UEFA Champions League, European Cup Winners' Cup, UEFA Cup and UEFA Super Cup.

Goalscorers
Competitive, professional matches only. Appearances, including substitutes, are shown in parentheses.
As of 19 March 2023.

By competition
Most goals scored in all competitions: 450 –  Cristiano Ronaldo, 2009–2018
Most goals scored in La Liga: 311 –  Cristiano Ronaldo, 2009–2018
Most goals scored in Copa del Rey: 49
 Ferenc Puskás, 1958–1966
 Santillana, 1971–1988
Most goals scored in Copa de la Liga: 8 –  Santillana, 1971–1988
Most goals scored in Supercopa de España: 7 –  Raúl, 1994–2010
Most goals scored in International competitions1: 113 –  Cristiano Ronaldo, 2009–2018
Most goals scored in European competitions2: 107  –  Cristiano Ronaldo, 2009–2018
Most goals scored in European Cup: 49 –  Alfredo Di Stéfano, 1953–1964
Most goals scored in UEFA Champions League: 105 –  Cristiano Ronaldo, 2009–2018
Most goals scored in European Cup Winners' Cup: 11 –  Santillana, 1971–1988
Most goals scored in UEFA Cup: 15 –  Santillana, 1971–1988
Most goals scored in UEFA Super Cup: 2
 Cristiano Ronaldo, 2009–2018
 Sergio Ramos, 2005–2021
 Karim Benzema, 2009–present
Most goals scored in Intercontinental Cup: 2 –  Ferenc Puskás, 1958–1966
Most goals scored in FIFA Club World Cup: 6 
 Cristiano Ronaldo, 2009–2018
 Gareth Bale, 2013–2022

1Includes all European club tournaments, Intercontinental Cup and FIFA Club World Cup.
2Includes European Cup / UEFA Champions League, European Cup Winners' Cup, UEFA Cup and UEFA Super Cup.

In a single season
Most goals scored in a season in all competitions: 61 –  Cristiano Ronaldo, 2014–15
Most goals scored in a single La Liga season: 48 –  Cristiano Ronaldo, 2014–15
Most goals scored in a single Copa del Rey season: 15 –  Ferenc Puskás, 1960–61
Most goals scored in a single Copa de la Liga season: 4 –  Santillana, 1983
Most goals scored in a single European Cup season: 12 –  Ferenc Puskás, 1959–60
Most goals scored in a single UEFA Champions League season: 17 –  Cristiano Ronaldo, 2013–14
Most goals scored in a single UEFA Champions League group stage: 11 –  Cristiano Ronaldo, 2015–16
Most goals scored in a single UEFA Champions League knockout stage: 10
  Cristiano Ronaldo, 2016–17
  Karim Benzema, 2021–22
Most goals scored in a single European Cup Winners' Cup season: 8 –  Santillana, 1982–83

In a single match
Most goals scored in a league match: 5
 Manuel Alday v Espanyol, 28 February 1943
 Antonio Alsúa v Castellón, 2 February 1947
 Miguel Muñoz v Lleida, 30 January 1951
 Pepillo II v Elche, 7 February 1960
 Ferenc Puskás v Elche, 22 January 1961
 Fernando Morientes v Las Palmas, 9 February 2002
 Cristiano Ronaldo v Granada, 5 April 2015
 Cristiano Ronaldo v Espanyol, 12 September 2015
Most goals scored in a Copa del Rey match: 6
 Benguría v Extremeño, 6 March 1927
 Ferenc Puskás v Real Betis, 18 June 1961
Most goals scored in a Copa de la Liga match: 4
 Santillana v Real Zaragoza, 22 June 1983
Most goals scored in a Supercopa de España match: 3
 Raúl v Zaragoza, 2001 Supercopa de España, 22 August 2001
Most goals scored in a European Cup match: 4
 Ferenc Puskás, v Eintracht Frankfurt, final 1959–60, and v Feyenoord, preliminary round 1965–66
 Alfredo Di Stéfano, v Sevilla, quarter-final 1957–58, and v Wiener Sport-Club, quarter-final 1958–59
 Hugo Sánchez v Swarovski Tirol, second round 1990–91
Most goals scored in a UEFA Champions League match: 4
 Cristiano Ronaldo v Malmö FF, group stage 2015–16
Most goals scored in a UEFA Super Cup match: 2
 Cristiano Ronaldo v Sevilla, 2014 UEFA Super Cup, 12 August 2014
Most goals scored in an Intercontinental Cup match: 2
 Ferenc Puskás v Peñarol, 1960 Intercontinental Cup, 4 September 1960
Most goals scored in a FIFA Club World Cup match: 3
 Cristiano Ronaldo v Kashima Antlers, 2016 FIFA Club World Cup final, 18 December 2016
 Gareth Bale v Kashima Antlers, 2018 FIFA Club World Cup semi-final, 19 December 2018

Others
Youngest goalscorer:  –  Alberto Rivera v Celta Vigo, 1994–95 La Liga, 10 June 1995
 Oldest post-Second World War goalscorer: –   Ferenc Puskás v Real Gijón, 1965–66 Copa del Generalísimo, 17 April 1966
Most goals scored in European Cup Finals: 7
 Alfredo Di Stéfano, one in 1956, 1957, 1958, 1959 and three in 1960
 Ferenc Puskás, four in 1960 and three in 1962
Most goals scored in UEFA Champions League Finals: 3
 Cristiano Ronaldo, one in 2014, and two in 2017
 Gareth Bale, one in 2014, and two in 2018
Most goals scored in Copa del Rey Finals: 4
 Manuel Prast, one in 1905, 1907, and two in 1906
 Jaime Lazcano, one in 1929, 1930, 1933 and 1934
 Ferenc Puskás, one in 1960, 1961 and two in 1962
Fastest goal: 13 seconds –  Iván Zamorano v Sevilla, 1994–95 La Liga, 3 September 1994
 Fastest hat-trick: 7 minutes —  Amancio v Sparta Prague, 1967–68 European Cup, 6 March 1968
 Fastest four goals: 20 minutes –  Cristiano Ronaldo v Malmö FF, 2015–16 UEFA Champions League, 8 December 2015
 Fastest five goals:  39 minutes –  Pepillo II v Elche, 1959–60 La Liga, 7 February 1960
 Most hat-tricks in all competitions: 44 –  Cristiano Ronaldo, 2009–2018
 Most hat-tricks in La Liga: 34 –  Cristiano Ronaldo, 2009–2018
 Most hat-tricks in a single season: 8 –  Cristiano Ronaldo, 2014–15 (all in La Liga – once with four goals and once with five goals)

Historical goals

Internationals
First international for Spain: Juan Monjardín,  v  (17 December 1922)
Most international caps (total): 196 – Cristiano Ronaldo, 
Most international caps as a Real Madrid player: 176 – Sergio Ramos, 
Most international goals (total): 118 – Cristiano Ronaldo, 
Most international goals as a Real Madrid player: 63 – Cristiano Ronaldo, 

FIFA World Cup winners
Below is the list of players who have won the FIFA World Cup as Real Madrid players.

  Günter Netzer (West Germany 1974)
  Jorge Valdano (Mexico 1986)
  Christian Karembeu (France 1998)
  Roberto Carlos (South Korea/Japan 2002)
  Iker Casillas (South Africa 2010)
  Raúl Albiol (South Africa 2010)
  Xabi Alonso (South Africa 2010)
  Sergio Ramos (South Africa 2010)
  Alvaro Arbeloa (South Africa 2010)
  Sami Khedira (Brazil 2014)
  Raphaël Varane (Russia 2018)

FIFA Confederations Cup winners
Below is the list of players who have won the FIFA Confederations Cup as Real Madrid players.

  Michael Laudrup (Saudi Arabia 1995)
  Roberto Carlos (Saudi Arabia 1997)
  Zé Roberto (Saudi Arabia 1997)
  Marcelo (Brazil 2013)

UEFA European Football Championship winners
Below is the list of players who have won the UEFA European Football Championship as Real Madrid players.

 Ignacio Zoco (Spain 1964)
 Amancio (Spain 1964)
 Uli Stielike (Italy 1980)
 Christian Karembeu (Belgium & Netherlands 2000)
 Nicolas Anelka (Belgium & Netherlands 2000)
 Iker Casillas (Austria & Switzerland 2008) and (Poland & Ukraine 2012)
 Sergio Ramos (Austria & Switzerland 2008) and (Poland & Ukraine 2012)
 Raúl Albiol (Poland & Ukraine 2012)
 Álvaro Arbeloa (Poland & Ukraine 2012)
 Xabi Alonso (Poland & Ukraine 2012)
 Pepe (France 2016)
 Cristiano Ronaldo (France 2016)

UEFA Nations League winners
Below is the list of players who have won the UEFA Nations League as Real Madrid players.
 Karim Benzema (Italy 2021)

Award winners
Ballon d'Or (1956–)
The following players have won the Ballon d'Or while playing for Real Madrid:
 Alfredo Di Stéfano – 1957, 1959
 Raymond Kopa – 1958
 Luís Figo – 2000
 Ronaldo – 2002
 Fabio Cannavaro – 2006
 Cristiano Ronaldo – 2013, 2014, 2016, 2017
 Luka Modrić – 2018
 Karim Benzema – 2022
FIFA World Player of the Year (1991–2009)
The following players have won the FIFA World Player of the Year award while playing for Real Madrid:
 Luís Figo – 2001
 Ronaldo – 2002
 Zinedine Zidane – 2003
 Fabio Cannavaro – 2006
FIFA Ballon d'Or (2010–2015)
The following players have won the FIFA Ballon d'Or while playing for Real Madrid:
 Cristiano Ronaldo – 2013, 2014
The Best FIFA Men's Player (2016–)
The following players have won The Best FIFA Men's Player while playing for Real Madrid:
 Cristiano Ronaldo – 2016, 2017
 Luka Modrić – 2018
European Golden Shoe
The following players have won the European Golden Shoe while playing for Real Madrid:
 Hugo Sánchez  – 1989–90 (38 goals)
 Cristiano Ronaldo  – 2010–11 (40 goals), 2013–14 (31 goals), 2014–15 (48 goals)
UEFA Club Footballer of the Year (1998–2010)
The following players have won the UEFA Club Footballer of the Year award while playing for Real Madrid:
 Fernando Redondo – 2000
 Zinedine Zidane – 2002
UEFA Best Player in Europe Award (2011–)
The following players have won the UEFA Best Player in Europe Award while playing for Real Madrid:
 Cristiano Ronaldo – 2014, 2016, 2017
 Luka Modrić – 2018
 Karim Benzema – 2022
UEFA Champions League Player of the Season (2022–)
 Karim Benzema – 2022
UEFA Champions League Young Player of the Season (2022–)
 Vinícius Júnior – 2022

Transfers

Highest transfer fees paid

Real Madrid's record signings are Gareth Bale and Eden Hazard. Bale signed for the club from Tottenham Hotspur for a total of £86 million in September 2013, according to media reports. Hazard signed from Chelsea for a fee of £103 million in June 2019. Furthermore, the variables fulfilled over the years pushed the total fee to €135 million.

Highest transfer fees received
Cristiano Ronaldo's transfer to Juventus in 2018 remains the club's record sale. Ronaldo was also their record transfer at the time of his move to Madrid in 2009.

Managers

Appearances
Competitive, professional matches only. Bold indicates manager is still active at club level. As of 19 March 2023.

Most wins 
Competitive, professional matches only. Bold indicates manager is still active at club level. As of 15 March 2023.

Others
First full-time manager:  Arthur Johnson.
Most years as manager: 15 years –  Miguel Muñoz (1959, 1960–1974)
Most titles won as manager: 14 –  Miguel Muñoz
Most goals scored under manager: 1,225 –  Miguel Muñoz
 Youngest manager:  –  Lippo Hertzka v Arenas de Getxo, 1929–30 La Liga, 23 March 1930
 Oldest manager:  –  Arsenio Iglesias v Real Zaragoza, 1995–96 La Liga, 25 May 1996

Managers' individual awards while managing Real Madrid:
FIFA World Coach of the Year / The Best FIFA Football Coach winners:
  José Mourinho – 2010
  Zinedine Zidane – 2017
 UEFA Club Coach of the Year winners:
  Vicente del Bosque – 2001–02
 Alf Ramsey Award winners:
  Vicente del Bosque – 2001–02
  José Mourinho – 2010
 IFFHS World's Best Club Coach winners:
  Vicente del Bosque – 2002
  José Mourinho – 2012
  Carlo Ancelotti – 2014, 2022
  Zinedine Zidane – 2017, 2018

Team records

Matches
First competitive match: 1–3 v Barcelona, 1902 Copa de la Coronación (semi-finals), 13 May 1902
First Copa del Rey match: 4–1 v Espanyol, 1903 Copa del Rey (semi-finals), 6 April 1903
First La Liga match: 5–0 v CE Europa, 1929 La Liga, 10 February 1929
First match at Santiago Bernabéu: 3–1 v Belenenses, 14 December 1947
First competitive match at Santiago Bernabéu: 3–1 v Espanyol, 1947–48 La Liga, 18 December 1947
First Copa Eva Duarte (and only) match: 3–1 v Valencia, 1947 Copa Eva Duarte, 8 June 1948
First Small Club World Cup match: 3–2 v La Salle, 1952 Small Club World Cup (group stage), 13 July 1952
First Latin Cup match: 2–0 v Belenenses, 1955 Latin Cup (semi-finals), 22 May 1955
First European Cup match: 2–0 v Servette, 1955–56 European Cup (round 1 – first leg), 8 September 1955
First Intercontinental Cup match: 0–0 v Peñarol, 1960 Intercontinental Cup (first leg), 3 July 1960
First European Cup Winners' Cup match: 0–0 v Hibernian, 1970–71 European Cup Winners' Cup (round 1 – first leg), 17 September 1970
First UEFA Cup match: 2–1 v Basel, 1971–72 UEFA Cup (round 1 – first leg), 15 September 1971
First Supercopa de España match: 1–0 v Real Sociedad, 1982 Supercopa de España (first leg), 13 October 1982
First Copa de la Liga match: 1–0 v Real Sociedad, 1983 Copa de la Liga (quarter-finals), 12 June 1983
First UEFA Champions League match: 0–1 v Ajax, 1995–96 UEFA Champions League (group stage), 13 September 1995
First UEFA Super Cup match: 0–1 v Chelsea, 1998 UEFA Super Cup,  28 August 1998
First FIFA Club World Cup match: 3–1 v Al-Nassr, 2000 FIFA Club World Championship (group stage), 5 January 2000

In a season
 Most matches played in a season: 66 matches (2001–02)
 Fewest matches played in a season: 0 matches (1911–12)

Record wins
Record league win: 11–2 against Elche (in 1959–60 La Liga)
Record cup win: 11–1 against Barcelona (in 1943 Copa del Generalísimo)
Record European win: 9–0 against B 1913 (in 1961–62 European Cup)
Record home win: 11–2 against Elche (in 1959–60 La Liga)
Record away win: 
 7–1 against Real Zaragoza (in 1987–88 La Liga)
8–2 against Deportivo La Coruña (in 2014–15 La Liga)

Record defeats
Record league defeat: 1–8 against Español (in 1929–30 La Liga)
Record cup defeat: 0–6 against Valencia (in 1998–99 Copa del Rey)
Record European defeat:
0–5 against 1. FC Kaiserslautern (in 1981–82 UEFA Cup)
0–5 against Milan (in 1988–89 European Cup)
Record home defeat: 0–6 against Athletic Bilbao (in 1930–31 La Liga)
Record away defeat: 1–8 against Español (in 1929–30 La Liga)

Streaks
Longest unbeaten run (all major competitions): 40 matches (from 2015–16 UEFA Champions League quarter-finals first leg to matchday 16 2016–17 La Liga season)
Longest unbeaten run (league): 28 matches (from matchday 27 2015–16 season to matchday 16 2016–17 season)
Longest unbeaten home run (league): 121 matches (from 1956–57 season to 1964–65 season)
Longest unbeaten away run (league): 18 matches (from matchday 32 1995–96 season to matchday 23 1996–97 season, from matchday 18 2015–16 season to matchday 14 2016–17 season and from matchday 9 2020–21 season to matchday 5 2021–22)
Longest unbeaten run from the first match of season (league): 28 matches (in 1988–89 season)
Longest winning streak (all major competitions): 22 matches (in 2014–15 season)
Longest winning streak (league): 16 matches (from matchday 27 2015–16 season to matchday 4 2016–17 season)
Longest winning home streak (league): 24 matches (from matchday 14 1988–89 season to matchday 21 1989–90 season)
Longest winning away streak (league): 13 matches (from matchday 23 2016–17 season to matchday 8 2017–18 season)
Longest winning streak from the first match of season (league): 9 matches (in 1968–69 season)
Longest drawing streak (league): 4 matches (in 1947–48, 1968–69, 1969–70 and 2006–07)
Longest losing streak (league): 5 matches (in 2003–04 and 2008–09)
Longest streak without a win (league): 9 matches (in 1984–85 season)
Longest scoring run (all major competitions): 73 matches (from 2015–16 UEFA Champions League semi-finals first leg to matchday 4 2017–18 La Liga season)
Longest scoring run (league): 54 matches (from matchday 27 2015–16 season to matchday 4 2017–18 season)
Longest scoring home run (league): 82 matches (from matchday 10 1951–52 season to matchday 19 1956–57 season)
Longest scoring away run (league): 35 matches (from matchday 18 2015–16 season to matchday 10 2017–18 season)
Longest non-scoring run (league): 3 matches (in 1984–85, 1993–94, 2001–02 and 2018–19)
Longest streak without conceding a goal (league): 7 matches (in 1997–98 season)

Wins/draws/losses in a season
Most league wins in a season: 32 in 38 games (in 2011–12 season)
Most league home wins in a season: 18 in 19 games (in 1987–88 and 2009–10 seasons)
Most league away wins in a season: 16 in 19 games (in 2011–12 season)
Most league draws in a season: 15 in 34 games (in 1978–79 season)
Most league defeats in a season: 13 in 34 games (in 1973–74 season)
Fewest league wins in a season: 7 in 18 games (in 1929–30 season)
Fewest league draws in a season:
 1 in 18 games (in 1929 season)
 1 in 22 games (in 1934–35 and 1939–40 season)
Fewest league defeats in a season: 0 in 18 games (in 1931–32 season)

Goals
Most league goals scored in a season: 121 (in 2011–12 season)
Most goals scored in a season in all competitions: 174 (in 2011–12 season)
 Best goal difference in a League season: +89 (in 2011–12 season)
Fewest league goals scored in a season: 24 (in 1930–31 season)
Most league goals conceded in a season: 71 (in 1950–51 season)
Fewest league goals conceded in a season: 15 (in 1931–32 season)

Points
Most points in a season:
Two points for a win: 66 in 44 matches (in 1986–87 season)
Three points for a win: 100 in 38 matches (in 2011–12 season)
Fewest points in a season:
Two points for a win: 17 in 18 matches (in 1929–30 season)
Three points for a win: 70 in 42 matches (in 1995–96 season)

Season-by-season performance

Honours

Official

Regional competitions
Campeonato Regional Centro / Trofeo Mancomunado:
 Winners (22, record): 1902–03, 1904–05, 1905–06, 1906–07, 1907–08, 1912–13, 1915–16, 1916–17, 1917–18, 1919–20, 1921–22, 1922–23, 1923–24, 1925–26, 1926–27, 1928–29, 1929–30, 1930–31, 1931–32, 1932–33, 1933–34, 1934–35, 1935–36
 Runners-up: (6) 1902–03, 1910–11, 1918–19, 1924–25, 1927–28, 1939–40
Copa Federación Centro:
 Winners (3, record): 1922–23, 1927–28, 1943–44
 Runners-up (1): 1940–41

Domestic competitions
La Liga:
 Winners (35, record): 1931–32, 1932–33, 1953–54, 1954–55, 1956–57, 1957–58, 1960–61, 1961–62, 1962–63, 1963–64, 1964–65, 1966–67, 1967–68, 1968–69, 1971–72, 1974–75, 1975–76, 1977–78, 1978–79, 1979–80, 1985–86, 1986–87, 1987–88, 1988–89, 1989–90, 1994–95, 1996–97, 2000–01, 2002–03, 2006–07, 2007–08, 2011–12, 2016–17, 2019–20, 2021–22
 Runners-up (24): 1929, 1933–34, 1934–35, 1935–36, 1941–42, 1944–45, 1958–59, 1959–60, 1965–66, 1980–81, 1982–83, 1983–84, 1991–92, 1992–93, 1998–99, 2004–05, 2005–06, 2008–09, 2009–10, 2010–11, 2012–13, 2014–15, 2015–16, 2020–21
Copa del Rey:
 Winners (19): 1905, 1906, 1907, 1908, 1917, 1934, 1936, 1946, 1947, 1961–62, 1969–70, 1973–74, 1974–75, 1979–80, 1981–82, 1988–89, 1992–93, 2010–11, 2013–14
 Runners-up (20, record): 1903, 1916, 1918, 1924, 1928–29, 1930, 1933, 1940, 1943, 1958, 1959–60, 1960–61, 1967–68, 1978–79, 1982–83, 1989–90, 1991–92, 2001–02, 2003–04, 2012–13
Copa de la Liga:
 Winners (1): 1985
 Runners-up (1): 1983
Supercopa de España:
 Winners (12): 1988, 1989, 1990, 1993, 1997, 2001, 2003, 2008, 2012, 2017, 2019–20, 2021–22
 Runners-up (6): 1982, 1995, 2007, 2011, 2014, 2022–23
Copa Eva Duarte:
 Winners (1): 1947

European competitions
European Cup / UEFA Champions League:
 Winners (14, record): 1955–56, 1956–57, 1957–58, 1958–59, 1959–60, 1965–66, 1997–98, 1999–2000, 2001–02, 2013–14, 2015–16, 2016–17, 2017–18, 2021–22
 Runners-up (3): 1961–62, 1963–64, 1980–81
European / UEFA Cup Winners' Cup:
 Runners-up (2, joint record): 1970–71, 1982–83
UEFA Cup / UEFA Europa League:
 Winners (2): 1984–85, 1985–86
European / UEFA Super Cup:
 Winners (5, joint record): 2002, 2014, 2016, 2017, 2022
 Runners-up (3): 1998, 2000, 2018
Latin Cup:
 Winners (2, joint record): 1955, 1957

Worldwide competitions
FIFA Club World Cup: 
 Winners (5, record): 2014, 2016, 2017, 2018, 2022
Intercontinental Cup: 
 Winners (3, joint record): 1960, 1998, 2002
 Runners-up (2): 1966, 2000
Copa Iberoamericana: 
 Winners (1, record): 1994

Unofficial

Santiago Bernabéu Trophy: 28 
 1981, 1983, 1984, 1985, 1987, 1989, 1991, 1994, 1995, 1996, 1997, 1998, 1999, 2000, 2003, 2005, 2006, 2007, 2008, 2009, 2010, 2011, 2012, 2013, 2015, 2016, 2017, 2018

Trofeo Ciudad de Alicante: 10
1990, 1991, 1992, 1993, 1995, 1998, 2000, 2001, 2002, 2010
Trofeo Teresa Herrera: 9
1949, 1953, 1966, 1976, 1978, 1979, 1980, 1994, 2013
Trofeo Ramón de Carranza: 6
1958, 1959, 1960, 1966, 1970, 1982
Trofeo Ciutat de Palma: 4
1975, 1980, 1983, 1990
Trofeo Ciudad de La Línea: 4
1981, 1982, 1986, 1994.
Trofeo Bahía de Cartagena: 4
1994, 1998, 1999, 2001
Trofeo Colombino: 3
1970, 1984, 1989
Trofeo Ciudad de Barcelona: 3
1983, 1985, 1988
Trofeo Euskadi Asegarce: 3
1994, 1995, 1996
Trofeo Festa d'Elx: 3
1984, 1985, 1999
Small Club World Cup:
 Winners (2, joint record): 1952, 1956
International Champions Cup: 3
2013, 2015 Australia, 2015 China
Trofeo Ciudad de Vigo: 2
1981, 1982
Trofeo Naranja: 2
1990, 2003

World Football Challenge: 2
2011, 2012
Trofeo Benito Villamarín: 1
1960
Mohammed V Trophy: 1
1966
Trofeo Año Santo Compostelano: 1
1970
Trofeo Costa del Sol: 1
1976
Trofeo Ciudad de Caracas: 1
1980
Trofeo Centenario A.C. Milan: 1
2000
Trofeo Jesús Gil: 1
2005
Taci Oil Cup: 1
2010
Franz-Beckenbauer-Cup: 1
2010
npower Challenge Cup: 1
2011
Audi Football Summit: 1
2016
MLS All-Star Game: 1
2017
In 2017, Real Madrid received the Nine Values Cup, an award of the international children's social programme Football for Friendship.

Achievements

Doubles
European double
La Liga and European Cup / UEFA Champions League: 4
1956–57, 1957–58, 2016–17, 2021–22

League and UEFA Cup double
La Liga and UEFA Cup: 1
1985–86

European cup double  
Copa del Rey and UEFA Champions League: 1
2013–14

European league cup double
Copa de la Liga and UEFA Cup: 1
1984–85

Domestic double
La Liga and Copa del Rey: 4
1961–62, 1974–75, 1979–80, 1988–89

Three-peats
European Cup / UEFA Champions League
 1955–56, 1956–57, 1957–58, 1958–59, 1959–60 (five-peat)
 2015–16, 2016–17, 2017–18

FIFA Club World Cup
 2016, 2017, 2018

La Liga
 1960–61, 1961–62, 1962–63, 1963–64, 1964–65 (five-peat)
 1966–67, 1967–68, 1968–69
 1977–78, 1978–79, 1979–80
 1985–86, 1986–87, 1987–88, 1988–89, 1989–90 (five-peat)

Copa del Rey
 1905, 1906, 1907, 1908 (four-peat)

Supercopa de España
 1988, 1989, 1990

Four titles in a season
2016–17
UEFA Super Cup, FIFA Club World Cup, La Liga, UEFA Champions League

2017–18 
UEFA Super Cup, Supercopa de España, FIFA Club World Cup, UEFA Champions League

Awards
FIFA Club of the Century: 2000
FIFA Order of Merit: 2004
IFFHS Best European Club of the 20th Century
Globe Soccer Best Club of the 21st Century 
 Globe Soccer Best Club of the Year: 2014, 2016, 2017 (record)
 IFFHS The World's Club Team of the Year: 2000, 2002, 2014, 2017
 Laureus World Sports Award for Team of the Year (nominated): 2001, 2003, 2015, 2017, 2018, 2019.
 World Soccer Men's World Team of the Year: 2017

Rankings
European Cup / UEFA Champions League all-time club rankings (since 1955): 1st place
 UEFA coefficient most top-ranked club by 5-year period (since 1975–1979): 15 times (record)
All-time La Liga table (since 1929): 1st place

Guinness World Records
 Most matches won in the UEFA Champions League era by a football team
 Most title wins of the top division in Spanish football
 Most consecutive UEFA Champions League football seasons scored in by a player (jointly held)
 Most wins of the football European Cup / Champions League title (team)
 Most consecutive matches won in the top division of Spanish football (jointly held)

Other achievements
 Most appearances in the European Cup / UEFA Champions League: 53 seasons
 First club to own the European Champion Clubs' Cup's official trophy.
 Most participations in the European Cup / UEFA Champions League since 1955: 64
 World's most valuable sports team: 2013, 2014, 2015
 First club to win consecutive UEFA Cups (1985 and 1986).
 Only team in UEFA club football history to defend both the European Cup and UEFA Champions League successfully.
 Only team to win consecutive FIFA Club World Cup titles as well as three titles in a row (2016, 2017, 2018).
 First and only club to win three consecutive (or more) European Cup / UEFA Champions League titles twice (1956–1960 and 2016–2018). 
 First and only club to win consecutive UEFA Champions League titles as well as three consecutive titles (2016, 2017, 2018). 
 Most club world championships titles.
 World's most valuable football club: 2013–2016, 2020
 Highest-earning football club in the world: 2006–2016, 2019
 Most European Cup / UEFA Champions League titles: 14
 Most UEFA club competition titles: 23
 First club to defend the European Double successfully.
 Only club to win five consecutive European Cup / UEFA Champions League titles (1956–1960).
 Most European Cup / UEFA Champions League final appearances: 17
 Most European Cup / UEFA Champions League semi-final appearances: 31
 Most consecutive seasons in the European Cup: 15 (1955–56 to 1969–70)
 Most consecutive appearances in the UEFA Champions League group stage: 26 (1997–98 to 2022–23)
 Most consecutive seasons in the UEFA Champions League knockout phase: 26 (1997–98 to 2022–23)
 Most consecutive UEFA Champions League semi-final appearances: 8 (2010–11 to 2017–18)
 Most consecutive European Cup final appearances: 5 (1956 to 1960)
 Most consecutive final appearances in the UEFA Champions League era: 3 (joint record)
 Most successful UEFA team to defend the European Cup / UEFA Champions League trophy: 6/13
 First club to win all UEFA Champions League group stage matches twice (2011–12 and 2014–15).
 First club to score in 34 consecutive UEFA Champions League matches (jointly held).
 Most consecutive knockout tie wins in UEFA Champions League history: 12

Footnotes
 

A.  The "Europe" column includes goals and appearances in the European Cup / UEFA Champions League, European / UEFA Cup Winners' Cup, and UEFA Cup / Europa League.
B.  The "Other" column includes goals and appearances in the Supercopa de España, Copa de la Liga, European / UEFA Super Cup, Intercontinental Cup, and FIFA Club World Championship / Club World Cup.

References

Statistics
Spanish football club statistics
Statistics